The Igunga by-election was a by-election held for the Tanzanian parliamentary constituency of Igunga in Tabora Region. It was triggered by the resignation of Rostam Aziz, the previous Member of Parliament (MP) who had held the seat for the Chama Cha Mapinduzi since 1994. The by-election took place on 2 October 2011 and the CCM candidate won by 50.46%.

Results

References

By-elections in Tanzania
October 2011 events in Africa
2011 elections in Tanzania